|}

The Webster Cup Chase is a Grade 2 National Hunt chase in Ireland which is open to horses aged five years or older. 
It is run at Navan over a distance of 2 miles (3,219 metres), and it is scheduled to take place each year in late March or early April.

The race was first run in 2000, as the Navan Commercials Truck Importers Chase.  From 2003 until 2010 it was known as the An Uaimh Chase (An Uaimh is Irish for Navan) and was awarded Grade 3 status in 2004.

The race was awarded Grade 2 status in 2011 and renamed as the Webster Cup Chase.

It was run over 2 miles and 4 furlongs until 2017 but was reduced to its current distance in 2018 when Fairyhouse and Navan agreed to swap the distances of their two Graded Chases scheduled for the spring, leading to the creation of the Devenish Chase.

Records
Most successful horse (2 wins):
 Any Second Now – 2021, 2023

Leading jockey (6 wins):
 Ruby Walsh – Moscow Express (2002), Rince Ri (2003), Nickname (2007), Glencove Marina (2010), Felix Yonger (2015), A Toi Phil (2017)

Leading trainer  (3 wins):
 Willie Mullins -  Glencove Marina (2010), Felix Yonger (2015), Great Field (2018)
 Ted Walsh -  Rince Ri (2003), Any Second Now (2021,2023)

Winners

See also
List of Irish National Hunt races

References

Racing Post:

National Hunt chases
National Hunt races in Ireland
Navan Racecourse